The Metalmoro JLM AJR is a sports prototype race car, designed, developed and built by Brazilian manufacturer Metalmoro, for endurance sports car racing, in 2017.

References

Sports prototypes